Countdown: Arena is a four-issue American comic book mini-series published by DC Comics. It is written by Keith Champagne with illustrations by Scott McDaniel, and ran for four weeks in December 2007.

A spin off of Countdown, the series features Monarch (Nathaniel Adam) as he organizes battles among various characters from the 52 Earths of the Multiverse. He then adds those he deems worthy to his army in preparation for a battle against the Monitors.  Monarch seeks to build a powerful strike team, specifically seeking powerful alternates for Superman, Batman, Wonder Woman, Green Lantern, the Flash, Blue Beetle, Nightshade, Starman, and the Ray to compose the squad.

Summary
Monarch's battles get underway as Eve of Shadows (Earth-13), Vampire Batman (Earth-43), Ray "the Ray" Palmer (Earth-6), Scarab (Earth-26), Hal Jordan Jr. (Earth-12), Starwoman (Earth-7), Johnny Quick (Earth-3), and Wonder Woman (Earth-34) are selected as Monarch's champions. The Batman of Earth-19 and Apollo of Earth-50 become Monarch's "backups", held in stasis. Throughout the series, tensions build between the all-American Superman of Earth-31 and his Russian Earth-30 counterpart. Superman-31 and Vampire Bat discover that a transporter miraculously designed by Earth-33's Ted Kord can travel the multiverse. After the group realizes the connection between Monarch and Captain Atom, Breach volunteers to collect the other counterparts from across the 52 earths in an attempt to overpower Monarch. In the conclusion, the Supermen fight is interrupted by a barrage of alternate Captain Atoms, who Monarch is able to overpower and absorb into himself. This reveals Ted Kord-33 and Breach (actually the brainwashed Breach of New Earth, not of Earth-8) to be his accomplices. Breach betrays Monarch by giving Superman-31 the transporter to save everyone on board the ship. The last man standing after Superman-31's departure and Superman of Earth-16's sacrifice, the Red Son Superman of Earth-30 becomes Monarch's final team member.

Battles

Nightshades
 Eve of Shadows of Earth-13: a sorceress named Eve Eden can manipulate shadows and controls a shadow realm. She is married to Brigadier Atom.
 Eve Eden: A Nightshade who appears similar to her New Earth counterpart, can manipulate and control darkness.
 The Shade, a female who carries a cane and wears a top hat. She is able to control all shadows.

The Shade attacks the other two Nightshades, mentioning she has not killed anyone in almost two days. Nightshade's limbs are severed by Shade. Eve of Shadows manages to pull the Shade into an alternate dimension called the Shadowlands, where Shade is defeated. Despite the victory, her husband and country are destroyed due to her violation of Monarch's rule against attempting to escape.

Batmen
 Batman of Earth-19: A Batman who started his career in the 1880s and defeated Jack the Ripper. Featured in Gotham by Gaslight.
 Batman of Earth-40, The Bat: A Batman who was a covert government operative under the alias The Bat during World War II. Featured in JSA: The Liberty Files. 
 Batman of Earth-43: A Batman who became a vampire after fighting Dracula. Featured in Batman & Dracula: Red Rain.

The two human Batmen unite to blind the vampire Batman with daggers, poison it with a cyanide capsule, and break its neck. But the creature turns into smoke and disappears before the Bat can plunge a dagger into its chest. The two remaining Batmen square off, agreeing not to use weapons or tricks, just skill. The vampire Batman chooses this moment to rematerialize behind the Batman of Earth-19, enabling the Bat to knock Batman of Earth-19 out when he turns around. The vampire Batman bites the Bat in the neck and tosses him away, but is blasted by Monarch before he can bite the fallen Batman (Countdown'''s interior art swaps the two defeated Batmen). Monarch removes the combatants from the arena, keeping the Batman of Earth-19 in stasis as a "spare". The Bat later rises as a vampire and attacks Monarch's disposal crew.

The Rays
 The Ray of Earth-10: A fascist Ray who bears a glowing swastika on his chest. Oddly, the Ray of Earth-10 shown in #52 fights alongside Uncle Sam and the Freedom Fighters. It is possible that this Ray is Ray Terril, as his costume resembles the New Earth Ray Terril's new uniform. The heroic Ray was possibly Happy Terril, his father (he is shown wearing the costume of the original Ray).
 Apollo of Earth-50: Member of the Wildstorm Universe's superhero group, the Authority (Keith Champagne said: "It doesn't necessarily mean Apollo is a Ray analogue, just that Monarch grouped him together with the other two [due to the solar-powered connection]").
 Ray Palmer of Earth-6: Formerly the Atom of his Earth, Ray retains his size-changing belt in addition to light controlling powers as the Ray.

The Ray of Earth-10 immediately attempts to fly out of the arena but is stopped by a force field. He then attacks the other two Rays, blinding Apollo with a blast of light. Ray Palmer helps the Nazi Ray escape the arena forcing Monarch to kill the Ray of Earth-10 for violating his rules. Apollo attacks Ray Palmer, mistaking him for Monarch. Ray shrinks and jumps into Apollo's head, blasting him from the inside out, defeating him, but leaving him alive. Monarch keeps Apollo in stasis alongside his spare Batman.

Blue Beetles
 Ted (Kord) of Earth-33: A giant man-sized blue beetle, pet of his world's Mr. and Mrs. Kord.
 Danny (Garrett) of Earth-39: A Dan Garrett whose scarab has bonded with him as New Earth's scarab has to Jaime Reyes.
 Scarab: A swarm of Blue Beetles from Earth-26 (mistakenly labeled Earth-21 when introduced).

Danny's scarab abandons him to join the swarm, leaving Danny defenseless and the swarm eats him. Ted attempts to crush the swarm piece by piece but the swarm flies inside the giant beetle and destroys him from the inside out. The swarm is victorious. Before his death, Ted screams for someone to "finish [his] work" (some sort of high-tech vest), but Monarch confiscates and destroys it.

Green Lanterns
 Green Lantern of Earth-5: A Green Lantern named Hal Jordan who comes from a world home to Captain Marvel and the Marvel Family.
 Green Lantern of Earth-12: A Green Lantern named Hal Jordan III, grandson of the original Hal Jordan, from the world of Batman Beyond.
 Green Lantern of Earth-32: A Green Lantern named Bruce Wayne who found Abin Sur's power ring. Featured in Batman: In Darkest Knight.

Once in the arena the three Lanterns ally together and cover it with a green field, preventing Monarch from being able to observe them, and forcing him to burn his way inside. The three Lanterns attack him, but their combined attacks have no effect at all. The Green Lantern of Earth-32 turns off his ring's safeties in order to throw one, powerful blast at Monarch's face. The blast destroys the face-plate of Monarch's containment suit, resulting in a massive explosion which kills the Earth-5 Green Lantern and renders the other two unconscious. Hal Jordan of Earth-12 the first to rise, though missing an arm from earlier in battle, is recruited by Monarch.  The Earth-32 Green Lantern is held in stasis.

Starmen
 Starwoman (Courtney Whitmore) of Earth-7: A brunette Starwoman equipped with a star rod.
 Starman of Earth-17: An intelligent gorilla who serves as peacemaker from an Earth home on Kamandi. Carries a star rod.
 Starman (Mikaal Tomas) of Earth-48: A male from "the black planet" empowered with cosmic abilities.

The Starman of Earth-17 and Starwoman chat in the arena while waiting for Starman of Earth-48 (who is still on the Shiftship attacking Monarch). Once teleported into the arena, the blue skinned Starman disintegrates the gorilla Starman's upper body instantly, seeking to win the fight as quickly as possible. He then tackles Starwoman, who blasts his face with her star rod in self-defense. She inadvertently decapitates the angry Starman, winning her match in a matter of seconds.

Flashes
 Jay Garrick of Earth-2: A WW II hero and a member of the Justice Society of America.
 Lia Nelson of Earth-9: The Flash of the Tangent Comics imprint, a Flash with various light-related abilities.
 Johnny Quick of Earth-3: A member of the villainous Crime Society of America, this alternate Flash is an evil counterpart to the Earth-2 Flash.

Johnny Quick chases after Lia before being punched in the face by Jay and being knocked out. Lia then betrays Jay with a blinding flash and starts punching him while yelling that she is not the crying wimp she made herself out to be on the ship. Jay warns her to look behind, but she ignores him and is impaled through the chest with a vibrating punch from a recovered Quick, incapacitating Lia. Quick challenges Jay to a race which Jay wins through treachery (throws his helmet at Johnny). Johnny feigns to be critical wounded and then vibro-punches Jay in the neck when he stoops down to help him, knocking Jay out, leaving Quick the winner.

Wonder Women
 Wonder Woman of Earth-18: A Wonder Woman who was sheriff of a western town in the 1890s. Featured in Justice Riders.
 Wonder Woman of Earth-21: A Wonder Woman who started her career in the 1940s. Featured in DC: The New Frontier.
 Wonder Woman of Earth-34: A Wonder Woman who freed women from the cruel oppression of King Jack in 19th Century England. Featured in Wonder Woman: Amazonia.

The three Wonder Woman agree to give this fight their all, and proceed to slug it out with punches and kicks. Just when the Wonder Woman of Earth-18 is about to step on Earth-21 Wonder Woman's face, she's knocked out by a punch to the neck from Earth-34 Wonder Woman. She and Earth-21 Wonder Woman square off, delivering simultaneous blows to the head. Being the first to rise, Earth-34 Wonder Woman is declared the winner by Monarch.

Captain Atoms
 Breach (Major Tim Zanetti) of New Earth but is thought to be from Earth-8.
 Ronald Raymond & Nathaniel Adam of Earth-37: merged to create Quantum-Storm. 
 Captain Atom of Earth-38: Leader of his world's Atomic Knights.

The final fight will be between the Captains Atom and the Monarch. Sensing this, the now-vampiric Bat uses the teleporter (built by Blue Beetle and powered by Breach) to send Breach to scour the Multiverse for more Captains Atoms. He then takes the other two Captains down to help him rescue the survivors. Breach assembles a team of his many counterparts including Earth-13's Brigadier Atom, Earth-22's Kingdom Come, Earth-4's Charlton Comics Captain Atom, Earth-30's Soviet Atom, a Doctor Manhattan-lookalike, President Atom, the robotic Quantum Mechanix, Quantum Boy, Captain Addama, a Hulked out "Attum", and many others. The Bat and the two Captains are confronted by Monarch and his army of soldiers. Monarch shares that he had planted the teleporter for Earth-33's Ted Kord to assemble (although Monarch seemingly mistakenly refers to him as a native of Earth-6) to give the group false hope. Monarch also reveals that Breach had been working for him all along and was in fact New Earth's Breach, who had survived the Infinite Crisis and been brainwashed by Monarch. Monarch then proceeds to destroy the Bat and the Captains Atom adding their powers to his own. Saving Earth-4's Captain Atom for last, Monarch simultaneously laments that he sacrificed his morality for the cause of defeating the Monitors and taunts Atom with the fact that since they are essentially the same man, a spark of Monarch's personality exists even within him. Breach betrays Monarch by giving Earth-31 Superman the fully charged teleporter device to save the heroes out of Monarch's holding cell.  Monarch kills Breach for his betrayal while admitting that he was planning to kill him anyway.

Supermen
 Superman of Earth-16: As verified by Keith Champagne, this Superman is Christopher Kent, who in the main DC Universe is the preteen biological son of General Zod. Earth-16 is referred to as the Pre-Crisis world of the "Supersons" as Superman Jr. and Batman Jr. were the direct sons of the famous characters.  Originally, Christopher was described as coming from Earth-15, where Zod apparently replaces Kal-El as Superman. However, prior to Countdown: Arena, Earth-15 and its heroes were destroyed by Superman-Prime.
 Superman of Earth-30: A Superman who lands in Communist Russia 35 years earlier and directly leads the Soviet Union to openly conquer most of Earth-30. Similar to the character featured in Superman: Red Son.
 Superman of Earth-31: A super-patriotic Superman as seen in All Star Batman and Robin the Boy Wonder, Batman: The Dark Knight Strikes Again, and Batman: The Dark Knight Returns.

The three Supermen battle, with Chris Kent holding a definite advantage. The Earth-31 and Earth-30 Supermen fly out of the arena and are nearly poisoned by radiation, but Chris saves them. The trio again battle with Chris absorbing enough of the other two's powers to become a glowing red giant. He tries to destroy Monarch and fails dying in the attempt. The proceedings are then interrupted by Breach, who has brought with him every other version of Captain Atom in the Multiverse. Monarch proceeds to kill them all and adding their atomic power to his own. During the confusion, Earth-31 Superman is given the transporter rig by Breach, who managed to free himself from Monarch's control, and uses it to free Monarch's "spares" and escape. In the aftermath of the battle, the Earth-30 Superman is the only fighter in the Arena alive protected by the Earth-30 Captain Atom. Monarch adds him to his roster and prepares to attack the Monitors.

Other
A page from the comic which appears in Previews and online solicitations also features Earth-26 (animal) Teen Titans, alternate Firestorms, alternate Batgirls and Robins with one pair appearing to be based on Batgirl and Robin: Thrillkiller while the other Robin matches the appearance of his Pre-Crisis Earth Two counterpart, an alternate Lobo, Ultraa, L.E.G.I.O.N. from the Elseworlds story L.E.G.I.O.N. 90210, Justice Society of America members (Mister Terrific I, Black Canary I, Hourman I, Doctor Mid-Nite I) from JSA: The Liberty Files, and JLA members (Aquaman, Martian Manhunter, Hawkgirl, and the Atom) from what resembles to be from the universe of JLA: The Nail. Monarch obliterates all these characters shortly after bringing in Superman of Earth-31, the last combatant, in order to demonstrate his own seriousness and ruthlessness.

Website
DC launched an Arena website in September 2007 where fans could vote for which heroes would appear in Monarch's army. The only heroes that people were able to vote for were alternate versions of Batman, Superman, Green Lantern, and Wonder Woman.

Collected editions
The series has been collected into a trade paperback:
 Countdown: Arena'' (168 pages, August 2008, DC Comics, Titan Books)

References

Comics articles that need to differentiate between fact and fiction
2007 comics debuts
Comics about parallel universes